The 1977–78 Scottish Inter-District Championship was a rugby union competition for Scotland's district teams.

This season saw the 25th Scottish Inter-District Championship.

South, Glasgow District and  Edinburgh District shared the competition with 2 wins and 1 loss each.

1977-78 League Table

Results

Round 1

Glasgow District: C. D. R. Mair (West of Scotland), T. Dunlop (West of Scotland), W. V. Dobbs (Kilmarnock), R. B. Campbell (Kilmarnock),David Shedden (West of Scotland), B. M. Gossman (West of Scotland), H. R. McHardy (Kilmarnock), J. MacLauchlan (Jordanhill) [captain],R. H. Allan (Kilmarnock), Hugh Campbell (Jordanhill), J. A. Martin (Jordanhill), D. J. M. Smith (Glasgow HSFP), J. G. Carswell (Jordanhill), D. S. M. Macdonald (West of Scotland), D. G. Leslie (West of Scotland)

Edinburgh District:

Round 2

South:

North and Midlands:

Round 3

North and Midlands: 

Glasgow District: 

Edinburgh District: 

South:

Round 4

Glasgow District: 

South: 

Edinburgh District:

North and Midlands:

Matches outwith the Championship

Other Scottish matches

Glasgow District: 

Anglo-Scots:

Trial matches

Blues: 

Whites:

References

1977–78 in Scottish rugby union
1977-78